Reclaiming Their Voice: The Native American Vote in New Mexico is a 2009 documentary film directed by filmmaker, Dorothy Fadiman, which documents ways in which Native Americans have been disenfranchised over centuries, in particular in voting representation.   It  chronicles the Laguna Pueblo tribe of New Mexico in their 2004 groundbreaking voter registration drive and the challenges they faced once Laguna voters arrived at the polls.   The film also shows the Sacred Alliance for Grassroots Equality's (SAGE) fight to preserve parts of the sacred Petroglyph National Monument.

The film is narrated by Peter Coyote and features interviews with members of the local Laguna community, including New Mexico House Representative, W. Ken Martinez.

Robin H. Levin, the  Community Librarian of the Fort Washakie School in  Wyoming, said of the film: "Emotions run deep when viewing this insightful political documentary. The story blends sincere efforts to achieve political clout with unfortunate results that, somehow, do not shut down the hopes of Native voters in New Mexico."

In 2010, the film won the “Best New Mexico Film Award” at the very first Duke City Doc Festival which later became the Albuquerque  International Film Festival.

Screenings and festivals
2009 United Nations International Film Festival, Stanford University
2009 Peninsula Peace and Justice Center July Screening
2010 American Indian Movement International Film Festival
2010 Bechtel International House Screening April 2010, Stanford University 
2010 Las Vegas Film Commission with the Las Vegas Peace and Justice Center
2010 Duke City Doc Fest/Albuquerque International Film Festival

References

External links 
 
 Reclaiming Their Voice: The Native American Vote in New Mexico & Beyond at vimeo.com
 Reclaiming Their Voice: The Native American Vote in New Mexico & Beyond at archive.org
  
 
 Film Screening Announcement for Dec 2010 on InMenlo.com
 Sacred Land Film Project to Save Petroglyph National Monument

2009 films
American documentary films
2009 documentary films
Documentary films about American politics
Documentary films about Native Americans
Documentary films about indigenous rights
Films directed by Dorothy Fadiman
Voter suppression
2000s English-language films
2000s American films
Native American history of New Mexico